"Witch" is the third episode of the first season of the television series Buffy the Vampire Slayer (1997-2003). It serves as the show's first regular episode after the Pilot and originally aired in the United States on March 17, 1997, on The WB Television Network. Sometimes billed as "The Witch", the episode was directed by Stephen Cragg and was the first episode not written by show creator Joss Whedon and the first of seven with no vampire in it.

The premise of Buffy the Vampire Slayer involves an adolescent girl named Buffy Summers who is chosen by mystical forces and endowed with superhuman powers in order to defeat vampires, demons, and other evils in the fictional town of Sunnydale. She accomplishes this with the assistance of a close circle of friends and family. In "Witch", Buffy attempts to maintain a level of normalcy in her life by auditioning for her school's cheerleading squad. However, Buffy and her friends must stop a fellow student from tampering with witchcraft in order to take competitors out of the running.

Plot
Despite Giles' (Anthony Stewart Head) misgivings, Buffy decides to try out for the cheerleading team in order to reclaim some of the happy, normal social life she enjoyed back in LA. During trials, the hands of a girl named Amber spontaneously combust. An unknown person is shown to be using Barbie dolls dressed as cheerleaders in a voodoo-like ritual over a cauldron. The next day, Cordelia is struck blind during her drivers ed class, and is saved from wandering into traffic in the nick of time by Buffy. According to Giles, blinding enemies is a favorite trick amongst witches.

Amy Madison (Elizabeth Anne Allen), another contender, seems to be under intense pressure to compete from her domineering mother (Robin Riker), a star cheerleader in her day once nicknamed "Catherine the Great", and is crushed when she only makes the substitute list after Cordelia Chase (Charisma Carpenter) and Buffy. Believing Amy to be a witch, Buffy, Xander (Nicholas Brendon) and Willow (Alyson Hannigan) collect some of Amy's hair during science class, to prove that she cast the spells. Amy goes home and orders her mother to do her homework, while she goes upstairs with a bracelet she stole from Buffy during class.

The next morning Buffy is behaving in a somewhat unstable manner. She blows her chance at the cheerleading squad when she tosses the head cheerleader, Joy, through the room, ceding her place to Amy. Buffy turns out to have something more than just a mood disorder: a bloodstone vengeance spell has destroyed her immune system, giving her only about three hours to live. The only way to cure her and break the other spells is to get the witch's spell book and reverse the magic. The ailing Buffy and Giles confront Amy's mother, Catherine, and find out that Catherine switched bodies with her daughter months before, saying that Amy was wasting her youth, so she took it for herself. Giles finds the witch's book and takes Amy and Buffy back to the school to break the spells.

Amy/Catherine is cheering Sunnydale's basketball team when she starts getting flashes of what Giles is trying to do. Xander and Willow are unable to stop her from storming into the science lab with an axe but buy enough time for Giles to break the spells: Amy and Catherine are restored to their own bodies, and Buffy feels well enough to fight. However, Amy's mother's power is too great, and it is only by reflecting her last spell back onto her that Buffy saves the day. Catherine vanishes with a scream.

After her mother’s disappearance, Amy’s father is delighted to have her live with him, and she tells Buffy she is really happy to finally have a normal parent/child relationship. As the two girls walk through the school hall together, they pass by the trophy collection where the cheerleading trophy of "Catherine the Great" stands. While both girls wonder where Amy's mother ended up, the camera pulls close to the statue's face, revealing the mother's eyes and a muffled voice pleading for help.

Broadcast and reception
"Witch" was first broadcast on The WB on March 17, 1997. It pulled in an audience of 3.2 million households.

Noel Murray of The A.V. Club gave the episode a grade of B, describing it as "an entertaining hour with a semi-clever twist". He liked the attention given to Joyce's role as Buffy's mother, but felt that more could have been done with the cheerleading storyline. A review from the BBC called it "predictable" and stated that the "script doesn't sparkle like Whedon's previous two episodes, and often lacks subtlety". However, the review praised the curses and Buffy under the spell. DVD Talk's Phillip Duncan described "Witch" as "[an] interesting look [at] peer pressure" and wrote, "Whedon and his crew easily take what could have been a simple monster-of-the-week plot and ground it firmly in the here and now."

References

External links
 

Buffy the Vampire Slayer (season 1) episodes
1997 American television episodes
Television episodes about witchcraft
Television episodes about dysfunctional families
Fiction about body swapping